The Chicago Film Critics Association Award for Best Supporting Actor is an annual award given by the Chicago Film Critics Association.

Winners

1980s

1990s

2000s

2010s

2020s

External links

Chicago Film Critics Awards - 1998-07
Chicago Film Critics Awards - 2008-

Supporting Actor
Film awards for supporting actor